The Master of the Legend of St. Ursula (1436–1505) was a Flemish painter active in the fifteenth century.  His name is derived from a polyptych depicting scenes from the life of Saint Ursula painted for the convent of the Black Sisters of Bruges. The city appears in the background of a number of the paintings, in which the belfry and tower of the Church of Notre-Dame are visible.  Consequently, it is possible, given the stages of construction of the belfry, to determine that the altarpiece was painted either before 1483 or somewhere between 1493 and 1499. The Netherlands Institute for Art History hold his birth and death dates to be those of Pieter Casenbroot, who was registered in the Bruges guild of saddlemakers and sculptors in 1460. Today the panels have been dispersed to a number of museums around the world.

A few other paintings have been attributed to the Master on the basis of style; these include a triptych of the Nativity in the Detroit Institute of Arts, as well as paintings in Brussels, Cherbourg, Middlebury, Toronto and Rochester. He is not to be confused with the Cologne master named for a different version of the life of Ursula.

References

External links

Fifteenth- to eighteenth-century European paintings: France, Central Europe, the Netherlands, Spain, and Great Britain, a collection catalog fully available online as a PDF, which contains material on the Master of the Legend of St. Ursula (cat. no. 16)
Master of the Legend of St. Ursula (Dutch) on artnet

1430s births
1500s deaths
Early Netherlandish painters
Legend of St. Ursula (Bruges)
Artists from Bruges